Di-Dar is the ninth and last Cantonese album by Hong Kong singer Faye Wong, released in December 1995 through Cinepoly. The album marked a shift from Wong's earlier style as she incorporated British psychedelic rock and ragga into her work, showcasing her evolving alternative musical influences. Di-dar featured compositions by Wong with arrangements by her then-husband Dou Wei, production by Zhang Yadong and lyrics by Lin Xi.

The album was both a critical and commercial success, selling 1.5 million copies across Asia; with its title track "Di-dar" and "Ambiguous" (曖昧) becoming well-known songs. Di-dar peaked at number one in Hong Kong according to the IFPI and Billboard magazine.

Critical reception
Di-Dar ranked at number 27 in Ming Pao Weekly'''s list of "40 Classic Cantopop Albums of the Last 40 Years" published in October 2008. Music journalist Fung Lai-Chee described it as "the best psychedelic and best-selling avant-garde work in Cantonese pop, with songs that are self-centred, ignoring market and others' work. Abstruse, obscure and mysterious."

Track listingDi-Dar假期 (Gaa Kei) – Vacation迷路 (Mai Lou) – Stray曖昧 (Ngoi Mui) – Ambiguous或者 (Waak Ze) – Maybe我想 (Ngo Seung) – I Think享受 (Hoeng Sau) – Enjoyment一半 (Yat Bun) – One Half無題 (Mou Tai) – (Untitled)流星 (Liu Xing) – Comet''

References

External links

1995 albums
Faye Wong albums
Cinepoly Records albums
Cantopop albums